Club Deportivo Díter Zafra was a Spanish football team based in Zafra, in the autonomous community of Extremadura. Founded in 1930 it last played in 3ª – Group 14, holding home matches at Nuevo Estadio de Zafra, with a capacity of 5,000 seats.

Dissolution
The club announced its dissolution on 28 January 2017. This decision was overturned two days later when a group of former club directors decided to invest in the team, and they continued with their season.

Finally, Díter Zafra was dissolved in August 2017.

Season to season

8  seasons in Segunda División B
31 seasons in Tercera División
10 seasons in Divisiones Regionales

Famous players
 Hipólito Rincón

References

External links
Official website 
Futbolme team profile 
Unofficial website 

Defunct football clubs in Extremadura
Association football clubs established in 1969
1969 establishments in Spain
Association football clubs disestablished in 2017
Province of Badajoz